Stéphane Houdet (born 20 November 1970) is a French wheelchair tennis player. Houdet is a former singles and doubles world number one. In 2014, he became the first man in history to complete the calendar-year Grand Slam in men's wheelchair doubles.

He competed in wheelchair tennis at the 2020 Summer Paralympics.

In July 2022, Houdet was suspended from competition after missing three anti-doping tests in a 12-month window.

2013
Houdet won two titles in the 2013 season with the victories achieved in Johannesburg and Sardinia. He was a losing finalist in Pensacola, Rome, Nottingham, St Louis and Rue. Houdet also won two Grand Slam singles titles at Roland Garros and New York and was the runner-up in Melbourne. Houdet partnered Ronald Vink to the doubles titles in Sydney and Nottingham. When Frederic Cattaneo was his partner in doubles tournaments they won titles in Baton Rouge and Johannesburg. They were also losing finalists in Pensacola. In doubles tournaments with Martin Legner Houdet won the title in Rome and was a losing finalist in Sardinia. Shingo Kunieda partnered Houdet to doubles titles in Paris and St Louis, as well as two Grand Slam titles at Roland Garros and Wimbledon. Partnering Gordon Reid, Houdet won titles in Rotterdam, Rue, the Masters doubles.

Grand Slam titles

 2007 French Open – Wheelchair men's doubles
 2009 French Open – Wheelchair men's doubles
 2009 Wimbledon Championships – Wheelchair men's doubles
 2009 US Open – Wheelchair men's doubles
 2010 Australian Open – Wheelchair men's doubles
 2010 French Open – Wheelchair men's doubles
 2011 US Open – Wheelchair men's doubles
 2012 French Open – Wheelchair men's singles
 2013 French Open – Wheelchair men's singles
 2013 French Open – Wheelchair men's doubles
 2013 Wimbledon Championships – Wheelchair men's doubles
 2013 US Open – Wheelchair men's singles
 2014 Australian Open – Wheelchair men's doubles
 2014 French Open – Wheelchair men's doubles
 2014 Wimbledon Championships – Wheelchair men's doubles
 2014 US Open – Wheelchair men's doubles
 2015 Australian Open – Wheelchair men's doubles
 2017 US Open – Wheelchair men's singles

Performance timelines

Wheelchair singles

Wheelchair doubles

References

External links
 
 
 

1970 births
Living people
French male tennis players
Wheelchair tennis players
Paralympic wheelchair tennis players of France
Paralympic gold medalists for France
Paralympic silver medalists for France
Paralympic bronze medalists for France
Paralympic medalists in wheelchair tennis
Wheelchair tennis players at the 2008 Summer Paralympics
Wheelchair tennis players at the 2012 Summer Paralympics
Wheelchair tennis players at the 2016 Summer Paralympics
Wheelchair tennis players at the 2020 Summer Paralympics
Medalists at the 2008 Summer Paralympics
Medalists at the 2012 Summer Paralympics
Medalists at the 2016 Summer Paralympics
Sportspeople from Saint-Nazaire
Tennis players from Paris
ITF World Champions
21st-century French people
Doping cases in tennis